Caladenia caesarea is a species of flowering plant in the orchid family Orchidaceae and is endemic to the south-west of Western Australia. It is a ground orchid with a single erect, hairy leaf and up to three mustard-coloured or lemon-yellow flowers.

Description

Taxonomy and naming
This orchid was first formally described in 1912 by Karel Domin who gave it the name Caladenia filamentosa var. caesarea in the Journal of the Linnean Society, Botany from specimens collected by Arthur Dorrien-Smith near Bridgetown in 1909. In 1989, Mark Clements and Stephen Hopper raised the variety to species status as Caladenia caesarea in Australian Orchid Research. 

In 2001, Hopper and Andrew Brown described three subspecies of C. caesarea in the journal Nuytsia, and the names are accepted by the Australian Plant Census:
 Caladenia caesarea subsp. transiens has the labellum evenly curved downwards.

Distribution and habitat
Subspecies caesarea grows in seasonally wet areas between Wagin, Tenterden and Busselton in the Avon Wheatbelt, Jarrah Forest and Mallee bioregions of south-western Western Australia. Subspecies maritima grows on granite and rock outcrops and is restricted to the Leeuwin-Naturaliste National Park and Ludlow areas of the Jarrah Forest bioregion, and subsp. transiens grows in shallow soil in open mallee in disjunct locations in the Jarrah Forest bioregion.

References

caesarea
Plants described in 1912
Endemic orchids of Australia
Orchids of Western Australia
Taxa named by Karel Domin